West Virginia Route 150 is a  long north–south scenic state highway in the Marlinton and Gauley Ranger Districts of the Monongahela National Forest in southeast West Virginia. The southern terminus of the route is at West Virginia Route 39 and West Virginia Route 55 northwest of Mill Point. The northern terminus is at U.S. Route 219 and WV 55 north of Edray, near Marlinton.

Route description

WV 150 is designated as the parkway portion of the Highland Scenic Highway. Due to these geographical conditions, the road is not maintained in the winter months. (Access is not prevented during the winter, however.)

The parkway section provides several scenic overlooks of Cranberry Glades and the Cranberry Wilderness to the west and of the Ridge-and-valley Appalachians to the east, from numerous points along the Allegheny Front.  The overlook at Black Mountain also provides an educational boardwalk that explains the irresponsible timbering practices that led to a destructive forest fire that left the area barren for decades.

The parkway also provides access to recreational areas along the Williams River and to several different trails with varying degrees of difficulty. The road is not plowed during the winter and commonly sees significant snow accumulations at its high elevation.  It is frequently used for snowmobiling and cross-country skiing in these conditions.

Major intersections

External links

Article from the Monongahela National Forest website.

References

150
Monongahela National Forest
Transportation in Pocahontas County, West Virginia
Tourist attractions in Pocahontas County, West Virginia